Geissoloma is a genus of flowering plants in the monotypic family Geissolomataceae, native to the Cape Province of South Africa.  The plants are xerophytic evergreen shrubs and are known to accumulate aluminum. It is sometimes called guyalone in English.

Description
Geissoloma marginatum is a low evergreen shrub of ½-1¼ m high, covered in overlapping large, leathery, simple, scale-like, opposite leaves in four rows along the stems. It has very small stipules on the petioles.  Flowers are bisexual, subtended by bracts, and have four red to pinkish petaloid sepals, four petals partially united, eight stamens, and four carpels. The fruit is a capsule with four seeds.

Geissoloma marginatum is the only species in the family.

Phylogeny
Recent phylogenetic analysis resulted in the following tree.

References

Monotypic rosid genera
Flora of South Africa
Crossosomatales